Flight 159 may refer to:
TWA Flight 159, crashed on 6 November 1967
Daallo Airlines Flight 159, successfully landed after on-board explosion, 2 February 2016

0159